Versailles is an  house belonging to Westgate Resorts founder David Siegel and his wife Jackie. It is under construction at 6121 Kirkstone Lane, Windermere, Florida, in the gated community of Lake Butler Sound in Orange County, Florida, United States. Named and modeled after the Palace of Versailles in France, the completed project would be one of the largest single-family homes in the United States. It is designed as the primary residence of the Siegels and their children.

History 
Construction began in 2004. Work stalled in 2009 with 60% completed as Siegel's company encountered financial difficulties. The house was subsequently listed for sale at $65 million. With Westgate Resorts' improved finances as of 2013, Siegel came to own the property outright and construction resumed. Completion was scheduled for 2016.  Then  the completion date had been pushed forward to at least 2019. As of November 2020 Jackie Siegel's estimated completion date remained a year and a half away, well into 2022. 
Expected to appraise at over $100 million, the project will be the fourth most expensive house in the United States.

Design 

Built on a constructed hill on 10 acres of lakefront property,  the residence will include 9 kitchens, 14 bedrooms, three indoor pools, two outdoor pools, a video arcade, a ballroom with a capacity of 500 to 1,000 persons, a two-story movie theater with a balcony inspired by the Palais Garnier, a 20,000-bottle wine cellar, an exotic-fish aquarium, two tennis courts, two-lane commercial grade bowling alley, a baseball diamond, a formal outdoor garden, and an elevator in the master bedroom closet. Because the Siegels' children are older now, modifications to the original plans included turning playrooms into a yoga studio and a teenager’s cave with a second movie theater.

Doors and windows are constructed using some of the last remaining legal Brazilian mahogany at a cost of $4 million, cut before the Brazilian government banned trade in big-leaf mahogany in 2001. Exterior walls are precast concrete with Pavonazzo marble veneer.

Documentary 

The home and its owners were the subject of the 2012 documentary film The Queen of Versailles as well as an episode of CNBC's Secret Lives of the Super Rich.

A follow-on TV series The Queen of Versailles Reigns Again follows the house and Siegel family on the Discovery+ streaming service.

References

External links 
  – Property appraisal

Houses in Orange County, Florida
Windermere, Florida
Unfinished buildings and structures in the United States
Siegel family residences
Châteauesque architecture in the United States